Trevor Bidstrup (born 29 November 1937) is an Australian cricketer. He played two first-class matches for Western Australia between 1957/58 and 1960/61.

See also
 List of Western Australia first-class cricketers

References

External links
 

1937 births
Living people
Australian cricketers
Western Australia cricketers